This article shows the women's squads of the participating teams at the 2018 Asian Women's Volleyball Cup.

Head Coach: Shannon Winzer
The following is the Australian roster from  Asianvolleyball

Head Coach: Shi Hairong
The following is the Chinese roster from  Asianvolleyball

Head Coach: Javad Mehregan
The following is the Iranian roster from  Asianvolleyball

Head Coach: Kiyoshi Abo
The following is the Japanese roster from  Asianvolleyball

Head coach: Shapran Vyacheslav

Head Coach: Lee Kyung-suk
The following is the South Korean roster from  Asianvolleyball

Head Coach: Cesael Delos Santos
The following is the Philippine roster from  Asianvolleyball

Head Coach: Lin Min-hui

Head Coach: Danai Sriwatcharamethakul
The following is the Thai roster from  Thailand Volleyball Association

Head coach:  Nguyễn Tuấn Kiệt
Assistant coaches:
 Lê Thị Hiền
 Trịnh Nguyễn Hoàng Huy

Notes:
 OH Outside Hitter
 OP Opposite Spiker
 S Setter
 MB Middle Blocker
 L Libero

References

Official report for 2018 Asian Women's Volleyball Cup squads

Asian Women's Volleyball Cup